Ghabrivirales is an order of double-stranded RNA viruses. It is the only order in the class Chrysmotiviricetes. The name of the class is a portmanteau of member families: chrysoviridae, megabirnaviridae, and totiviridae; and -viricetes which is the suffix for a virus class. The name of the order derives from Said Ghabrial, a pioneering researcher who studied viruses in this order, and -virales which is the suffix for a virus order.

Taxonomy

The following families are recognized:
Chrysoviridae
Megabirnaviridae
Quadriviridae
Totiviridae

References

Viruses